is a Japanese figure skater. She is the 2023 World Junior champion, the 2022 Junior Grand Prix Final champion, a two-time ISU Junior Grand Prix gold medalist, the 2022 Japanese national bronze medalist, and a two-time Japanese junior national champion (2021–2022). She is the twenty-first woman in history to have successfully landed a triple Axel jump in competition.

Personal life 
Shimada was born on 30 October 2008 in Koganei, Tokyo, Japan. Her mother was a fan of Japanese figure skater Mao Asada and named Shimada after her. She enjoys dancing, bowling, and cooking.

As of March 2021, she graduated from Okubo Elementary School and currently attends Hirono Junior High School.

Career

Early years 
Shimada began skating at age five after watching Mao Asada at the 2014 Winter Olympics. She finished in fifth place at the 2018 Japan Novice B National Championships.

2019–20 season 
She won the 2019 Japan Novice B National Championships scoring 88.50.

2020–21 season 
She won the 2020 Japan Novice A National Championships, attempting a triple Axel in the free program. She fell, and the jump was marked as downgraded.

Shimada was invited to compete at the junior event. She placed third behind teammate Hana Yoshida and Rino Matsuike but was too young to compete at the senior division.

She was invited to skate in the gala at the 2020 NHK Trophy as the reigning Japanese national novice champion.

2021–22 season 
Shimada started her season competing at the 2021 Kinki Regional Championships. She opened her program, landing a clean quad toe loop. She was selected for the 2021 Japan Novice National Championships and won the competition. She was then invited to compete in the junior division.

At 2021–22 Japan Junior National Championships, she skated a clean short program but still placed fourth. However, Shimada managed to land the quad toe once again and won the competition over Rion Sumiyoshi and Mone Chiba. She was still too young to compete in the senior event.

Shimada was sent to 2022 Egna Trophy to compete in the advanced novice category. She attempted a triple Axel during the free program, but the jump was landed on a quarter. Winning the gold medal, she outscored Canadian silver medalist Hetty Shi by 32.63 points.

2022–23 season: Junior World and JGP Final gold 
In early September 2022, Shimada made her ISU Junior Grand Prix debut at the event in Ostrava, Czech Republic. She landed all her jumps cleanly in her short program and placed first with 71.49 points. During the free skate, Shimada successfully landed a triple Axel and became the twenty-first woman to land it in international competition. She then attempted a quadruple toe loop but underrotated the jump, resulting in a fall; the program was otherwise clean. Shimada won the event with a lead of 23.28 points over South Korea's Kwon Min-sol. At her second Junior Grand Prix assignment in Gdańsk, Poland, Shimada scored 68.81 in the short program after landing her jump combination on a quarter. She landed a clean triple Axel and a quadruple toe loop on a quarter in the free skate, winning the event and earning new season bests for the free skate and total score. These results qualified her for 2022–23 Junior Grand Prix Final. 

Following her Junior Grand Prix victories, Shimada successfully defended her title at the 2022–23 Japan Junior Championships. After winning the short program, she fell on her opening triple Axel attempt in the free skate but went on to land her quad and her remaining triple jumps to finish first there as well. Two weeks later at the Final in Turin, Shimada landed all her jumps successfully in the short program, albeit with her triple Lutz deemed landed on a quarter. With a score of 69.66 points, she finished first in the segment, 0.55 points of reigning World Junior silver medalist Shin Ji-a of South Korea. In the free skate, she stepped out of her triple Axel and underrotated her quad attempt, but was first in that segment as well, winning the gold medal with an overall margin of 5.22 points over Shin. Shimada claimed to "aim for the performance that satisfies myself and not the placement," adding that while it was "a big competition and a big victory and it gave me the confidence" that "my goal was to land the first two jump, both the triple Axel and the quad toe, so I regret a little that that didn’t happen this time." She was the first Japanese and first non-Russian women's champion at the event since Kanako Murakami in 2009.

Attending her first senior Japan Championships, Shimada was fourth in the short program with a 70.28 score, her first over the 70-point mark domestically. She said she was "glad I was able to put it together in a very tense situation." In the free skate, Shimada fell twice on her opening triple Axel and quad attempts, before landing seven clean triple jumps. She was fifth in the segment, but rose to third overall in a somwhat chaotic field, winning the bronze medal. Too young for international senior assignments, she was assigned to finishing her season at the 2023 World Junior Championships.

At the World Junior Championships in Calgary, Shimada finished first in the short program with a new personal best, 0.59 points ahead of Shin in second place. She described practices in the leadup as difficult, as thus was pleased with her performance on the day. Two days later in the free skate, Shimada landed both her triple axel and quadruple toe loop, although the latter jump was completed on the quarter. She then skated the rest of her program cleanly, receiving another personal best of 152.76, winning the event with the fifth highest score ever recorded by a junior woman. Her margin of victory of 22.64 over silver medalist Shin Ji-a was the same exact margin as her namesake Mao Asada over Yuna Kim of South Korea at the 2005 World Junior Championships. Shimada became the first Japanese woman to win Junior Worlds since Marin Honda in 2016, and alongside country mate and bronze medalist Ami Nakai, secured three spots for Japanese women the following year.

Programs

Competitive highlights 
JGP: Junior Grand Prix

Detailed results 
Current personal best scores are highlighted in bold.

Junior level

References

External links 
 
 SHIMADA Mao on Japan Skating Federation

Japanese female single skaters
Living people
2008 births
Sportspeople from Tokyo